The Education and Skills Funding Agency (ESFA) is an executive agency of the government of the United Kingdom, sponsored by the Department for Education. 

The ESFA was formed on 1 April 2017 following the merger of the Education Funding Agency and the Skills Funding Agency. It brings together the existing responsibilities of the Education Funding Agency (EFA) and Skills Funding Agency (SFA), creating a single agency accountable for funding education, apprenticeships and training for children, young people and adults.  Previously the EFA was responsible for distributing funding for state education in England for 3-19 year olds, as well as managing the estates of schools and colleges; and the SFA was responsible for funding skills training for further education in England and running the National Apprenticeship Service and the National Careers Service.

In the 2019–20 financial year, the agency was responsible for a budget of £59billion and had approximately 1,500 staff.

Eileen Milner has been the agency's Chief Executive since November 2017. Previously she was a director at the Care Quality Commission.

References

External links 
 

2017 establishments in the United Kingdom

Education in England
Department for Education
Executive agencies of the United Kingdom government
Government agencies established in 2017
Higher education organisations based in the United Kingdom